The Canelo Hills Cienega Reserve, is a nature preserve southeast of Sonoita, Arizona on the east side of the Canelo Hills. The area's  are a mix of rare cienega wetland and black oak and Arizona fescue fields. The preserve is notable for the extremely rare Canelo ladies tresses orchid (Spiranthes delitescens)  and the Gila chub and Gila sucker that grow along its alkaline banks. The ranch was purchased by the Nature Conservancy in 1969 from the Knipes family. It was designated a National Natural Landmark in December 1974.

References

External links
 Arizona chapter of the Nature Conservancy (site is now managed by Ramsey Ranch location)

National Natural Landmarks in Arizona
Nature Conservancy preserves
Protected areas of Santa Cruz County, Arizona
Nature reserves in Arizona